I Used To Love Her or similar can refer to these songs:

 "I Used to Love H.E.R." by Common Sense
 "I Useta Lover" by The Saw Doctors
 "Used to Love Her" by Guns N' Roses
 a song by Jay Sean on the album My Own Way